The San Francesco di Paola Bridge or Cosenza Bridge is a road bridge in Cosenza, Italy, designed by Spanish architect Santiago Calatrava. 

The bridge spans the River Crati to connect two neighbourhoods in Cosenza, Contrada Gergeri and Via Reggio Calabria. It was first planned in 2004 and was built as part of a regional regeneration programme at a cost of approximately €20 million, paid for in part by the  government programme, which was originally intended to build housing. It was inaugurated on 26 January 2018.

It is built of steel, concrete, and stone, and provides for future construction of a steel and glass enclosure to shelter pedestrians. The lighting design by Zumtobel Group uses LEDs.

See also
 List of bridges in Italy

References

External links
 
 "Ponte sul Crati" at Santiago Calatrava's website

Buildings and structures in Calabria
Cable-stayed bridges in Italy
Road bridges in Italy
Bridges completed in 2018
Bridges by Santiago Calatrava